Iolaus hemicyanus is a butterfly in the family Lycaenidae. It is found in Cameroon, Equatorial Guinea (Bioko), the Republic of the Congo, the Democratic Republic of the Congo, Uganda, Kenya and Tanzania. The habitat consists of forests.

The larvae feed on Globimetula braunii and Phragmananthera usuiensis.

Subspecies
Iolaus hemicyanus hemicyanus (Uganda, western Kenya, north-western Tanzania)
Iolaus hemicyanus barbara Suffert, 1904 (Cameroon, Equatorial Guinea)
Iolaus hemicyanus barnsi (Joicey & Talbot, 1921) (Republic of the Congo, Democratic Republic of the Congo: Uele, Tshopo, Kivu, Maniema, Sankuru and Lualaba)

References

External links

Die Gross-Schmetterlinge der Erde 13: Die Afrikanischen Tagfalter. Plate XIII 68 g ssp. barbara Suffert, 1904

Butterflies described in 1904
Iolaus (butterfly)